This is a chronological list of ships launched in 2021.


References

2021
Ship launches
 
Ship launches